Ei is the third studio album by Finnish pop rock singer-songwriter Maija Vilkkumaa. Released by Warner Music in Finland on 7 March 2003, the album debuted at number one on Finnish Albums Chart, maintaining the peak position for two weeks and charted for 56 weeks altogether. Ei was the third-best-selling album of 2003 in Finland and, with sales of over 120,000 copies to date, has received a quadruple-platinum certification in the country. Ei ranks also 38th on the list of the best-selling albums of all time in Finland.

Background
Prior to the release, Maija visited New York City to spend time relaxing and writing new songs.

Singles
The (rough) English translations of the tracks are in the brackets.
"Ei" (No)
"Mun elämä" (My Life)
"Ei saa surettaa" (You Shouldn't Feel Sad)

Track listing
The (rough) English translations of the tracks are in the brackets.

Charts and certifications

Weekly charts

Year-end charts

Certifications

See also
List of best-selling albums in Finland

References

2003 albums
Maija Vilkkumaa albums
Finnish-language albums